The Local Police, of Romania is an institution of the Romanian Police that operates at a local level. The Local Police was established in 2011 by Law No. 155/2010. According to law, city councils can hire no more than one local policeperson for every 1,000 inhabitants. The Local Police generally receives a large part of a city council's budget, but there are controversies regarding the usefulness of the institution, which has been criticized for its poor coordination and poor police training.

See also
 Municipal police
 Romanian Police
 Romanian Gendarmerie

References

External links
  . Parliament of Romania.

Law enforcement in Romania
Municipal law enforcement agencies